Pharris is a surname. Notable people with the surname include:

Chrystee Pharris (born 1976), American actress
Jackson C. Pharris (1912–1966), United States Navy officer
USS Pharris

See also
Farris (surname)
Parris